"I Thought I'd Seen Everything" is a rock song written by Bryan Adams, Eliot Kennedy and Robert John "Mutt" Lange for Adams 10 solo album 11 (2008). The song's musical-style and production were heavily inspired by rock and pop music from the 1980s, and its lyrics chronicle a relationship. The song was released as a download only single in the UK on 17 March 2008.

The song made its North American premiere in February 2008.

Recording and production 
In 1991 Robert Lange co-wrote a song with the same title for his ex-wife Stevie Vann; however according to Adams website, the title and writer are only similarities that exist between the two songs, and that this song is an entirely new composition. Adams did also work with Stevie Vann in the past.

Chart performance 
Although "I Thought I'd Seen Everything" was officially released to US radio on March 1, 2008, it proved somewhat popular on Adult Contemporary radio where it peaked at the top thirty and peaked at 20. In Canada "I Thought I'd Seen Everything" was officially released to radio in March, 2008. The song reached the top fifty on the Canadian Hot 100 chart where it peaked at the top 50 on 47.

The song was released in Australia, Europe and New Zealand on March 1, 2008. "I Thought I'd Seen Everything" peaked at the top 200 at 146. "I Thought I'd Seen Everything" continued the trend of lower-charting singles which was started by Adams Room Service single Flying. "I Thought I'd Seen Everything" peaked in the top 40 in Hungary and Austria, and the top 50 in Switzerland and Germany.

Music video 

The music video for "I Thought I'd Seen Everything" was directed by Andrew MacNaughtan and Bryan Adams.

The video features Adams and his band performing the song live in a studio, similar to the style of "Please Forgive Me", released in 1993. In an interview with Dominick A. Miserandino  from The Celebrity Cafe Adams talked about how if felt to direct the music video:

Track listing 
The two B-sides on the CD single are not available on all versions of the album, 11.

CD

UK digital download

Release history

Charts

References 

Bryan Adams songs
2008 singles
Songs written by Robert John "Mutt" Lange
Songs written by Bryan Adams
Songs written by Eliot Kennedy
Polydor Records singles
2007 songs